Repin is a crater on Mercury.  Its name was adopted by the International Astronomical Union (IAU) in 1976. Repin is named for the Russian painter Ilya Repin.

References

Impact craters on Mercury